Jon-Paul Roger "JP" Pietersen (born 12 July 1986 in Stellenbosch, South Africa) is a South African rugby union player for the  in the Currie Cup. He generally plays fullback or wing but occasionally, he plays at outside centre. He played in 69 tests for the Springboks.

Youth and early career
His 2006 Super 14 season was disrupted by injuries but despite this, he was included in the South African under-21 team to compete at the 2006 Under 21 Rugby World Championship. South Africa made the final, but were defeated by the hosts, France.

International career
Upon arriving back to South Africa after the under-21 World Championship he was named in the Springboks' 2006 Tri Nations Series squad where he debuted against New Zealand at the Royal Bafokeng Stadium in Rustenburg.

Pietersen's deceptive pace and gliding runs make him an unpredictable back-line player, with the ability to break the line at will and create attacking opportunities for his team. He is also a clinical finisher, and was the leading try scorer in the 2007 Super 14 competition with 12 tries from 15 games. Pietersen remains a firm fan favourite for the unpredictable and exciting dimension his play brings to the team. Before the emergence of François Steyn at the Sharks franchise, Pietersen was seen as the ideal replacement for Percy Montgomery as fullback, however with Steyn being able to play at fullback, wing or fly-half, Pietersen focused on wing as his primary position, and it is in this role that most of his appearances have been made for club and country.

He was selected into the Springboks 2007 Rugby World Cup squad. Starting in the first two matches, Pietersen scored three tries. He was impressive in the game against England, scoring two tries and setting up a third.

The top try-scorer in the 2007 Super 14 failed to score even one in 2008, a fact acknowledged by both AJ Venter and Stefan Terblanche in the October 2008 edition of SA Sports Illustrated.

However, post World Cup Pietersen went on to establish the most capped wing combination in Springbok history with Bryan Habana, standing currently at 25 tests, ten more than next best, James Small and Jaques Olivier. Aside from his obvious attacking abilities, Pietersen is widely regarded for his outstanding defence. His cover defence being the saving grace of the Springbok's 2008 End of Year Tour, manfully keeping the Welsh at bay, and dominating his opposite Shane Williams. His all-round skills remain of the highest standard, maturing into one of the best wings since South Africa's readmission to international sport.

Pietersen was called up for South Africa's 2011 Rugby World Cup campaign starting the first game in a 17–16 victory for the Springboks against Wales. South Africa then thrashed Fiji 49–3 with Pietersen this time playing on the left wing. Pietersen did not play when South Africa thrashed Namibia 87–0. He started again on the right wing as South Africa squeezed past Samoa 13–5. South Africa were then through to the quarter-finals of the world cup. South Africa were then knocked out of the tournament losing 11–9 against Australia. He has also scored 4 tries in the 2015 world cup.

Pietersen signed a three-year deal to join English Premiership side Leicester Tigers prior to the 2016–2017 season. However, as of 20 June 2017, Pieterson was granted early release from Welford Road to join top French club Toulon in the Top 14 from the 2017-18 season.

Notes

References

External links

JP Pietersen at Genslin Springbok stats

SA Sports Illustrated. "Showdown at ... Quiz Creek: AJ Venter vs Stefan Terblanche." October 2008: 32.

1986 births
Living people
People from Stellenbosch
Cape Coloureds
South African rugby union players
South Africa international rugby union players
Sharks (rugby union) players
Sharks (Currie Cup) players
Rugby union fullbacks
Rugby union wings
Rugby union centres
Saitama Wild Knights players
South African expatriate rugby union players
South African expatriate sportspeople in Japan
Expatriate rugby union players in Japan
Leicester Tigers players
RC Toulonnais players
Rugby union players from the Western Cape